Orocrambus melitastes is a moth in the family Crambidae. It was described by Edward Meyrick in 1909. This species is endemic to New Zealand, where it has been recorded in  Southland, Otago and Westland. It is found from the subalpine zone down to sea level.

The wingspan is 17–22 mm. Adults are on wing from October to January.

References

Crambinae
Moths described in 1909
Moths of New Zealand
Endemic fauna of New Zealand
Taxa named by Edward Meyrick
Endemic moths of New Zealand